Ty'Son Williams (born September 4, 1996) is an American football running back for the Arizona Cardinals of the National Football League (NFL). He played college football at North Carolina, South Carolina and BYU and went undrafted in the 2020 NFL Draft.

College career
Regarded as a four-star recruit out of Crestwood High School, Williams signed with North Carolina. He transferred to South Carolina after one year. In two seasons with the Gamecocks, Williams rushed for 799 yards. He entered the transfer portal as a graduate and came to BYU over offers from Fresno State and Marshall. In his first game against Utah, he was named the starting running back and had seven carries for 6.4 yards per carry. The following week, he rushed for 94 yards and was pushed across the goal line by the Cougar offensive line for the game-winning touchdown in a 29–26 double overtime win over Tennessee. Williams played in four games before tearing his ACL against Washington. He tallied 49 carries for 264 yards, an average of 5.4 yards per carry, and three touchdowns in addition to seven receptions for 47 yards.

Professional career

Baltimore Ravens
The Baltimore Ravens signed Williams on August 28, 2020. He was waived on September 5, 2020, and re-signed to the practice squad the next day. He was elevated to the active roster on December 2 for the team's week 12 game against the Pittsburgh Steelers, and reverted to the practice squad after the game.  On January 18, 2021, Williams signed a reserve/futures contract with the Ravens. Originally set to be third on the depth chart, injuries to J. K. Dobbins, Justice Hill, and Gus Edwards set him up to start in the season opener against the Las Vegas Raiders. In the game, he had nine carries for 65 yards, including 35 yard run for his first professional touchdown, along with three receptions for 29 yards. However, the Ravens lost in overtime 27–33. Williams quickly fell out of favor with the Ravens and lost his starting role to Latavius Murray.

On March 9, 2022, the Ravens placed an exclusive-rights free agent tender on Williams. However, the Ravens withdrew the tender on May 10, making him a free agent.

Indianapolis Colts 
On May 24, 2022, Williams signed with the Indianapolis Colts. He was waived on August 30, 2022.

Arizona Cardinals 
On October 12, 2022, Williams was signed to the Arizona Cardinals practice squad. He was signed to the active roster on January 7, 2023.

References

External links
BYU Cougars football bio

1996 births
Living people
American football running backs
Arizona Cardinals players
Baltimore Ravens players
BYU Cougars football players
Indianapolis Colts players
South Carolina Gamecocks football players
Sportspeople from Sumter, South Carolina
North Carolina Tar Heels football players
Players of American football from South Carolina